Nəvahı (also, Navahı and Navagi) is a village and municipality in the Hajigabul Rayon of Azerbaijan. It has a population of 3,354. The municipality consists of the villages of Nəvahı and Pirsaat.

References 

Populated places in Hajigabul District